Permission to Fly is the second and final studio album by American singer-songwriter Jordan Pruitt. On July 22, 2008, the album was released exclusively to Limited Too stores, and was given a wider physical release on August 26, 2008. In early September 2008, the album was released on iTunes, but was removed for unknown reasons later that month. Before its release, the worldwide premiere of the album was broadcast over Radio Disney on July 19, 2008.

Background
Before the release of Permission to Fly, Pruitt had signed on as the spokesperson for several multi-media national marketing campaigns with brand such as Kraft Foods, Kimberly-Clark, Colgate-Palmolive, Samsung and Limited Too. When picking songs for the album, Pruitt used her "5-second rule." If the track didn't grab her in five seconds, she didn't record it. Pruitt worked with a team of top songwriter/producers, including Shelly Peiken, Arnthor Birgisson, Tim James & Antonina Armato (better known as Rock Mafia), and Adam Watts & Andy Dodd. Pruitt also co-wrote many of the songs, and wanted the album to be more mature than her 2007 debut album No Ordinary Girl. Speaking on the differences between Permission to Fly and No Ordinary Girl, Pruitt said "I kind of grew up after the first record was done. I became more of myself. I really found out who I was and what I wanted to be."

Composition
Permission to Fly is mainly a pop album with influences of jazz and R&B. Several of the songs are about teen romance, with lyrics detailing love at first sight and the ups and downs of relationships. First single "One Love" is a reggae-tinged ode to a loyal partner, and second single "My Shoes" is about school crushes. "Boyfriend" is a confident assertion that her boyfriend won't be stolen by a flirtatious rival, and "Simple Things" is a song about how much pain can be caused by the smallest reminder of a former love. Other songs on the album are focused on self-empowerment and positivity. Title track "Permission to Fly" is about finding your own identity, and in "Unconditional" Pruitt sings about how her faith gets her through the toughest of times. The album consists of 11 original compositions with one cover, "The Way You Do the Things You Do" originally performed by the Temptations.

Track listing

Critical reception

Permission to Fly received generally positive reviews from critics. Common Sense Media opined "While some of the songs have a bubblegum sound and predictable lyrics, there are some very likeable bright spots on the album, including a sassy remake of the Temptations classic, The Way You Do The Things You Do, and the surprisingly jazzy, syncopated Secrets. And, not all of the songs on this album are about boy stuff. Permission to Fly is about finding your own identity; in Unconditional, Jordan reminds us that she's a girl of faith, and how that gets her through the toughest of times. If nothing else, this teen is versatile." The site gave the album three out of five stars.

AllMusic gave the album a mixed review, saying "On her 2008 sophomore outing, Permission To Fly, young Southern singer Jordan Pruitt presents another assured set of Disney-approved pop. While there are no drastic stylistic departures, Pruitt expands on her straightforward teen-pop sound with the reggae-tinged One Love (not to be confused with the Bob Marley song of the same name) and the R&B-leaning Unconditional." "One Love", "Unconditional", and "Simple Things" were listed as the stand-out tracks on the album.

Credits
Credits for Permission To Fly adapted from Allmusic

Aris Archontis -Audio Production, Mixing
Antonina Armato - Audio Production
Mats Berntoft - Guitars, Member of Attributed Artist
Arnthor Birgisson - Audio Production
David Choi - Programming
Andy Dodd - Audio Production, Drums, Guitar (Acoustic), Keyboards, Mixing, Programming
Dream Lab - Audio Production
Mark Hammond - Audio Production
Steve Hammons - Audio Engineer
Leah Haywood - Vocals
Tal Herzberg - Audio Engineer
Sean Hurley - Bass (Acoustic), Bass Instrument
Angie Irons - Arranger, Vocals
Daniel James - Audio Engineer, Vocals
Tim James - Audio Production

Adam Kagan - Mixing
Devrim "DK" Karaoglu - Audio Production
David Kopatz - Arranger, Audio Production, Guitars, Mixing, Programming
Savan Kotecha - Vocals (Background)
Nigel Lundemo - Audio Engineer
Jeannie Lurie - Audio Production
Chen Neeman - Audio Production
Paul Palmer - Mixing
Tim Pierce - Guitars
Jordan Pruitt - Primary Artist, Vocals, Vocals (Background)
Brian Reeves - Audio Engineer, Mixing
Reid Shippen - Mixing
Mounia Tajiou - Vocals (Background)
Phil Tan - Mixing
Windy Wagner - Vocals, Vocals (Background)
Adam Watts - Audio Production, Keyboards, Mixing, Programming

Singles

"One Love"
Released: June 10, 2008 (MySpace), June 14, 2008 (Radio Disney), July 8, 2008 (iTunes)Length: 3:02Genre: Dance-pop, reggaeLabel: HollywoodWriters: Leah Haywood, Daniel James, Shelly Peiken

"One Love" is the lead single from Permission to Fly. A snippet of the song was added on Pruitt's MySpace on June 10, 2008. She performed the song at the opening of the Disney Channel Games in 2008. It premiered on Radio Disney on June 14, 2008 and was produced by Shelly Peiken. It was available on iTunes on July 8, 2008. "One Love" was very successful on Radio Disney, appearing in the top three of Radio Disney's website multiple times. The song failed to attract Top 40 mainstream radio airplay, and therefore did not chart.

"My Shoes"
Released: October 3, 2008 (Radio Disney), October 7, 2008 (MySpace), December 21, 2008 (iTunes)Length: 3:04Genre: Dance-pop, R&BLabel: HollywoodWriters: Arnthor Birgisson, Savan Kotecha

"My Shoes" is the second single from the Permission to Fly. Pruitt performed the song at the opening of the Disney Channel Games in 2008. It premiered on Radio Disney on October 3, 2008. The music video for "My Shoes" was shot in a high school in Los Angeles, California on August 27, 2008. On December 21, 2008 "My Shoes" was released as a single on iTunes.

In March 2008, Pruitt started to discuss a second single from Permission to Fly with her record label. She and her record label went right for "My Shoes" so it was ready to be the second single. It was released on October 7, 2008. It was shown on the Disney Channel Games 2008. Like Pruitt's lead single from this album, "My Shoes" also failed to attract mainstream radio airplay and the song did not chart.

Release history

References

2008 albums
Albums produced by Rock Mafia
Hollywood Records albums
Jordan Pruitt albums